KYYO (96.9 FM), known as "South Sound Country 96.9 KAYO" is an American radio station broadcasting a country music format in the Olympia/Tacoma area. Licensed to McCleary, Washington, the station is owned by KGY Inc, and broadcasts at 96.9 MHz with an effective radiated power of 11,000 watts. Its transmitter is located near McCleary, Washington on Maxwell Hill, and operates from its studios at the Port of Olympia.

History
 This station signed on the air on March 29, 1992 as Classic Rock 96.9 KGY-FM, by current owner, KGY, Inc. A format change in 1997 featured a shift to Real Country, originally one of the Satellite Music Network stations, with local information and sports, and Washington State Cougars football.

On February 25, 2012, the station changed its format to country, branded as "96.9 KAYO Country", taking the old format and branding of KDDS. It had previously been "96.9 The Sound" with "Cool Classics and Hot Hits," and before that, used the Real Country satellite classic country network.

On November 19, 2013, the station took its current KYYO call sign.

References

External links

YYO
Grays Harbor County, Washington
Radio stations established in 1988